Victoria General Hospital is a hospital in Halifax, Nova Scotia, Canada, and part of the Queen Elizabeth II Health Sciences Centre, which began as the City Hospital in 1859.

History
The hospital was established in 1867 by the City of Halifax and the provincial government when the former City and Provincial Hospital at the same site (Peter McGuigan, The Historic South End Halifax) was renamed; the City and Provincial Hospital having been established in 1859. In 1841 the idea of replacing the current hospital began, but it would be until 1844 that anything was accomplished from the meeting of the Medical Professional of Halifax. With the mayor donating his annual salary to kick start funding, the remaining funding was highly talked about between the provincial and city politicians. Finally in 1857 in a large open rather boggy field the building was completed in 1857 at a cost of $38,000 which was paid for by the city of Halifax. Due to many problems with the building it lay virtually vacant from 1860 to 1866.

Hospital Superintendent
 Dr. Henry S. Jacques 1890-1892
 Dr. A. P. Reid  1892-1898
 Wallace W. Kenney 1898-1931
 Dr. George A. MacIntosh
 Dr. C. M. Bethune 1946-1969

Modern history

In 1948 a new Victoria General Hospital was opened immediately east of the land which would eventually become home to the IWK Health Centre, a children's hospital, on a block bounded by Tower Road, University Avenue and South Street and was the largest hospital in the province in terms of both staff and bed capacity. A hospital parking area was established in the lot between Tower Road and South Park Street; in the 1980s the lot was expanded to physically join with the hospital facilities, effectively dividing Tower Road into two sections north and south of the facility. Historically, "the VG", as it is called, was aligned with the Dalhousie University Faculty of Medicine as the province's only teaching hospital. The Victoria General Hospital's emergency department was closed and consolidated at the new Infirmary site in 1998.

Victoria Building cornerstone
The cornerstone reads:
This stone was laid by The Honourable A. Stirling MacMillan Premier of Nova Scotia September 5, 1945, Brookfield Construction Co Ltd. Andrew R Cobb Architect and C. St. J. Wilson Associate.

Site buildings
Bethune
MacKenzie
Centre for Clinical Research
Dickson
Victoria
Centennial

First patient
A farmer named Mr. Hubley was the first patient of the new hospital; he was treated for his wikt:strophulus ankle joint in 1887.

VG archive & museum
The archives and museum were set up in 1982 by nursing and physician staff at the hospital through the VG nursing school. Local historian nurse Madeline McNeil, who worked in the Victorian-era 1887 hospital as a nursing student, and Dr. Ron Stewart have been active members of the museum and VG archive.

The VG archives and museum were first organized by Alfreda McQuade (VG class 1919) while a supervisor at the VG Hospital in 1938 along with several nurses; the items gathered were stored in a room in the old VG hospital. When the new nurses' residence (Bethune Building) was opened in 1952, two rooms were designated for displays and a storage area in the basement of the MacKenzie building. Elizabeth Brown (VG class 1950) was in charge of the archives at this time and soon was joined by Helen Abass (class 1950) and Don Carruthers (VG class 1941). By 1990 the volunteer staff consisted of Shirley Dicks, Madeleine McNeil (VG class 1947) and Marjorie Barteaux. In 1996 the VG School of Nursing Archives received the Phyllis Blakeley Award for Archival excellence. Currently the manager is Gloria Stephens (VG class 1953A).

Ambulance services
The Victoria General Ambulance service begin in 1867, with a single horse cart that was stabled behind the Jubilee building. On March 10, 1867, requisition for the first ambulance was signed for by accountant Dr. Charles Putter. In 1928 the first motor vehicle named the "Black Moriah" was purchased followed in 1949 by a 31-foot five-door ambulance with push-button operation air conditioning, electric fans, and leather seating. The first emergency medical assistants' training program was initiated under the leadership of Dr. Cain, which would later be known as paramedics. In 1987, a 24-hour paramedic-trained unit was staffed at the Emergency Department under the medical direction of Dr. Mike Murphy.

Services

1890: Training School for Nurses opened – one of the first in Canada
1904: first X-ray equipment was installed
1912: Facilities of Pathology opened
1919: further expansion of the hospital nurses' residence and private pavilion began

Notable staff
Dr. Ron Stewart 
Dr. Robert Scharf

References

External links
http://www.cdha.nshealth.ca/
https://www.amazon.ca/century-care-Victoria-hospital-1887-1987/dp/B002ILFGI0

Hospitals in Halifax, Nova Scotia
Hospital buildings completed in 1887
Hospitals established in 1887